National Route 337 is a national highway of Japan connecting Chitose, Hokkaidō and Otaru, Hokkaidō in Japan, with a total length of 92.4 km (57.41 mi).

References

National highways in Japan
Roads in Hokkaido